The South Hills are a low mountain range of the Transverse Ranges, within the San Gabriel Valley in eastern Los Angeles County, California.

The South Hills are north of the Interstate 210 Freeway, in the southern part of the city of Glendora, with the western portion of the hills in the City of Glendora's South Hills Park.

They are north of the unincorporated town of Charter Oak and northwest of the city of San Dimas.

References

External links 
Park Locations and Facilities, City of Glendora

Mountain ranges of Southern California
Mountain ranges of Los Angeles County, California
Transverse Ranges
Geography of the San Gabriel Valley
Glendora, California